Isaak Abramovich van Brinen (12 August 1768 – 2 December 1848) was a Russian diplomat, and a Privy Councillor since 1846. He was also a member of the State Council of the Russian Empire.

Biography 
Isaak van Brinen was part of a Dutch merchant family, members of which had settled in Arkhangelsk at the beginning of the 18th century. He was the son of Abraham van Brinen (1702–1792), who had been general consul of Austria in Arkhangelsk, and Elisabeth Vernezobr.

In 1791 van Brinen joined the Collegium of Foreign Affairs of the Russian Empire. From 1804 he was an adviser to the chancellery, from 1806 he was the secretary of the mission in Copenhagen. In 1815–1816 during the absence of the envoy he worked as a chargé d'affaires of the Russian Empire in Denmark. In 1819 he was appointed Consul General in Stockholm. In 1840 he retired with the rank of Active State Councillor, but remained in Stockholm, where he died.

Van Brinen is buried in the cemetery of Solna, now part of Stockholm.

Awards 
For his service he was awarded the Russian  Order of Saint Vladimir in all three classes, as well as the Swedish Order of the Polar Star.

References

Links 
 Isaak Abramovitj van Brienen
 Дипломаты Российской империи

1768 births
1848 deaths
Recipients of the Order of St. Vladimir, 1st class
Recipients of the Order of St. Vladimir, 2nd class
Recipients of the Order of St. Vladimir, 3rd class
Commanders Grand Cross of the Order of the Polar Star
Diplomats of the Russian Empire
Privy Councillor (Russian Empire)